Samuel Klein is a doctor and nutritional specialist known for his research into weight loss and the causes of obesity.  He is currently the Danforth Professor of Medicine and Nutritional Sciences at Washington University in St. Louis. His brother, Morton Klein is the president of ZOA.

References 
 Weighty research, from the Washington University Record, September 3, 2004
 Dryden J. "Samuel Klein becomes Danforth Professor", Washington University Record (2000)
 Washington University School of Medicine: Geriatrics and Nutritional Science: Samuel Klein, M.D.

Living people
Year of birth missing (living people)
Washington University in St. Louis faculty
Jewish physicians